Phytorus is a genus of leaf beetles in the subfamily Eumolpinae. It is distributed in Southeast Asia.

Species
 Phytorus antennalis Medvedev & Moseyko, 2003
 Phytorus cyclopterus Lefèvre, 1885
 Phytorus dilatatus Jacoby, 1884
 Phytorus laysi Medvedev & Moseyko, 2003
 Phytorus pinguis (Baly, 1867)

Synonyms and species moved to other genera:
 Phytorus assimilis Lefèvre, 1890: moved to Rhyparida
 Phytorus fervidus Lefèvre, 1885: moved to Rhyparida
 Phytorus gibbosus Lefèvre, 1885: moved to Phytorellus
 Phytorus latus Weise, 1910: moved to Phytorellus
 Phytorus leyteanus Medvedev, 1995: moved to Rhyparida
 Phytorus lineolatus Weise, 1923: moved to Rhyparida
 Phytorus nigripes Lefèvre, 1885: moved to Rhyparida
 Phytorus pallidus Lefèvre, 1890: moved to Rhyparida
 Phytorus plebejus Lefèvre, 1885: moved to Rhyparida
 Phytorus puncticollis Lefèvre, 1885: synonym of Phytorus dilatatus Jacoby, 1884
 Phytorus simplex Lefèvre, 1885: moved to Rhyparida, synonym of Rhyparida lineolata (Weise, 1923)
 Phytorus tibiellus Weise, 1922: moved to Rhyparida
 Phytorus tonkinensis Lefèvre, 1893: moved to Tricliona

References

Eumolpinae
Chrysomelidae genera
Beetles of Asia
Taxa named by Martin Jacoby